This is a list of high schools in the state of Alaska, United States with their athletic/extracurricular designations in parentheses as determined by the Alaska School Activities Association.

Aleutians East Borough

Aleutians East Borough School District

Aleutians West Census Area

Aleutian Region School District

Unalaska School, Unalaska (3A)

Municipality of Anchorage

Anchorage School District

Alternative Career Education School, Anchorage
Anchorage Junior Academy, Anchorage
Anchorage Outreach/Private School, Anchorage
Atheneum School, Anchorage
Anchorage Christian Schools, Anchorage
Birchwood Christian School, Chugiak
Eagle Crest Academy, Anchorage
Grace Christian School, Anchorage (3A)
Heritage Christian School, Anchorage (3A)
Holy Rosary Academy, Anchorage (1A)
iGrad~Alaska, Anchorage
Interior Distance Education of Alaska (IDEA), Anchorage
Lumen Christi High School, Anchorage (1A)
McKinley Heights School, Eagle River
Pacific Northern Academy, Anchorage (1A)

Bethel Census Area
Akiuk Memorial School, Kasigluk
Akula Elitnaurvik School, Kasigluk
Aniak High School, Aniak (1A)
Anna Tobeluk Memorial School, Nunapitchuk
Ayaprun School, Newtok
Chaptnguak School, Chefornak
Chief Paul Memorial, Kipnuk
Crow Village Sam School, Chuathbaluk
Dick R. Kiunya Memorial School, Kongiganak
Eek School, Eek
George Morgan Junior/Senior High School, Upper Kalskag (1A)
JoAnn Alexie School, Atmautluak
Ket'acik-Aapalluk Memorial School, Kwethluk
Kuinerrarmiut Elitnaurviat School, Quinhagak
Kwigillingok School, Kwigillingok
Lewis Angapak Memorial School, Tuntutuliaks
Lower Kuskokwim School District
Bethel Alternative Boarding School, Bethel
Bethel Regional High School, Bethel (3A)
Moses Peter School, Akiachak
Nelson Island School, Toksook Bay
Nightmute School, Nightmute
Nuniwarmiut School, Mekoryuk
Paul T. Albert Memorial School, Tununak
QuQuum School, Oscarville
Rocky Mountain School, Goodnews Bay
Tuluksak School, Tuluksak
William Miller Memorial School, Napakiak
Z. John Williams Memorial School, Napaskiak

Bristol Bay Borough

Bristol Bay Borough School District

Denali Borough

Denali Borough School District

Dillingham Census Area

Dillingham City School District

Chief Ivan Blunka School, New Stuyahok
Koliganek School, Koliganek
Manokotak School, Manokotak
Togiak School, Togiak

Fairbanks North Star Borough

Fairbanks North Star Borough School District

iGrad~Alaska, Fairbanks
Interior Distance Education of Alaska (IDEA), Fairbanks
Monroe Catholic High School, Fairbanks (3A)
Career Education Center, Fairbanks
North Pole Academy, North Pole

Haines Borough

Haines Borough School District

Hoonah-Angoon Census Area

Chatham School District

Hoonah City School District

City and Borough of Juneau

Juneau Borough School District

iGrad~Alaska, Juneau
Interior Distance Education of Alaska (IDEA), Juneau

Kenai Peninsula Borough

Kenai Peninsula Borough School District

Cook Inlet Academy, Soldotna (2A)
iGrad~Alaska, Kenai
Interior Distance Education of Alaska (IDEA), Kenai

Ketchikan Gateway Borough

Ketchikan Gateway Borough School District

Kodiak Island Borough
Akhiok School, Akhiok
Chiniak School, Chiniak
Karluk School, Karluk
Kodiak High School, Kodiak (4A)
Larsen Bay School, Larsen Bay
Old Harbor School, Old Harbor
Ouzinkie School, Ouzinkie
Port Lions School, Port Lions

Lake and Peninsula Borough
Chignik Bay School, Chignik
Chignik Lake School, Chignik Lake
Kokhanok School, Kokhanok
Meshik School, Port Heiden
Newhalen School, Newhalen
Nondalton School, Nondalton
Perryville School, Perryville
Tanalian School, Port Alsworth

Kusilvak Census Area

Kashunamiut School District

Alakanuk School, Alakanuk
Andreafski School, St. Mary's
Emmonak School, Emmonak
Hooper Bay High School, Hooper Bay
Ignatius Beans School, Mountain Village
Kotlik School, Kotlik
Marshall School, Marshall
Pilot Station School, Pilot Station
Pitkas Point School, Pitkas Point
Russian Mission School, Russian Mission
Scammon Bay School, Scammon Bay
Sheldon Point School, Nunam Iqua

Matanuska-Susitna Borough
iGrad~Alaska, MatSu
Interior Distance Education of Alaska (IDEA), MatSu
Matanuska-Susitna Borough School District
Burchell High School, Wasilla
Colony High School, Palmer (4A)
Glacier View School, Sutton
Houston High School, Big Lake (4A)
Mat-Su Career & Technical High School, Wasilla
Palmer High School, Palmer (4A)
Redington Jr./Sr. High School, Wasilla
Susitna Valley High School, Talkeetna (3A)
Twindly Bridge Charter School, Wasilla
Valley Pathways High School, Palmer
Wasilla High School, Wasilla (4A)
Wasilla Lake Christian School, Wasilla

Nome Census Area

Bering Strait School District

Nome-Beltz Middle High School, Nome (3A)

North Slope Borough
Alak School, Wainwright (1A)
Barrow High School, Utqiagvik (3A)
Harold Kaveolook School, Kaktovik (1A)
Kali School, Point Lay
Meade River School, Atqasuk (1A)
Nuiqsut Trapper School, Nuiqsut (1A)
Nunamiut School, Anaktuvuk Pass (1A)
Tikgaq School, Point Hope (1A)

Northwest Arctic Borough
Aqqaluk School, Noorvik (1A)
Buckland School, Buckland (1A)
Davis-Ramoth School, Selawik
Deering School, Deering
Ikiaiaglig School, Ambler
Kiana School, Kiana
Kotzebue High School, Kotzebue
McQueen School, Kivalina
Napaaqtugmiut School, Noatak
Shungnak School, Shungnak

Petersburg Census Area
Petersburg High School
Grades 9-12
145 Students
2A

Kake City School District

Petersburg High School, Petersburg (2A)

Prince of Wales-Hyder Census Area

Annette Island School District

Craig City School District

Hydaburg City School District

Klawock School, Klawock
Southeast Islands School, Thorne Bay
Thorne Bay School, Thorne Bay

City and Borough of Sitka
Mt. Edgecumbe High School, Sitka (3A)
Pacific High School (Sitka, Alaska), Sitka
Sitka High School, Sitka (3A)

Municipality of Skagway
Skagway High School, Skagway

Southeast Fairbanks Census Area

Alaska Gateway School District

Delta-Greely School District

Valdez–Cordova Census Area

Chugach School District

Copper River School District

Cordova City School District

Valdez High School, Valdez

City and Borough of Wrangell
Wrangell High School, Wrangell (2A)

City and Borough of Yakutat
Yakutat School, Yakutat

Yukon-Koyukuk Census Area

Galena City School District

Iditarod Area School District

Allakaket School, Allakaket (1A)
Andrew K. Demoski School, Nulato
Fort Yukon School, Fort Yukon (1A)
iGrad~Alaska, Galena
Interior Distance Education of Alaska (IDEA), Galena
Jimmy Huntington School, Huslia (1A)
Johnny Oldman School, Hughes (1A)
Kaltag School, Kaltag
Maudrey J. Sommer School, Tanana (1A)
Merriline A. Kangas School, Ruby
Minto School, Minto (1A)
Nenana High School, Nenana (2A)
Project Education Residential School, Galena

See also
 List of middle schools in Alaska
 List of school districts in Alaska

External links
 List of high schools in Alaska from SchoolTree.org
 iGrad~Alaska
 Interior Distance Education of Alaska (IDEA)

References

High School
 
High School
Alaska